Girl + is an EP by punk blues band Boss Hog.

Track listing

All songs written by Boss Hog and produced by Cristina Martinez. The Japanese version includes the Action Box EP.

Band members

 Cristina Martinez
 Jon Spencer
 Jens Jurgensen
 Hollis Queens

Additional musicians

 Kurt Hoffman – saxophone on "Ruby"
 Frank London – trumpet on "Ruby"

References

External links
 

1993 EPs
Amphetamine Reptile Records EPs
Boss Hog albums